The Bolivia national under-16 and under-17 basketball team is a national basketball team of Bolivia, administered by the Federación Boliviana de Básquetbol (FBB).

It represents the country in international under-16 and under-17 (under age 16 and under age 17) basketball competitions.

It lastly appeared at the 2017 South American U17 Championship.

See also
Bolivia national basketball team
Bolivia national under-19 basketball team
Bolivia women's national under-17 basketball team

References

External links
Bolivia Basketball Records at FIBA Archive

U-17
Men's national under-17 basketball teams